Qaleh Rashid Aqa (also Romanized as ; also known as , , , and ) is a village in Howmeh-ye Sarpol Rural District, in the Central District of Sarpol-e Zahab County, Kermanshah Province, Iran. At the 2006 census, its population was 238, in 54 families.

References 

Populated places in Sarpol-e Zahab County